Rebecca Horn (born 24 March 1944, in Michelstadt, Hesse) is a German visual artist, who is best known for her installation art, film directing, and her body modifications such as Einhorn (Unicorn), a body-suit with a very large horn projecting vertically from the headpiece. She directed the films Der Eintänzer (1978), La ferdinanda: Sonate für eine Medici-Villa (1982) and Buster's Bedroom (1990). Horn presently lives and works in Paris and Berlin.

Early life and education
Rebecca Horn was born on 24 March 1944 in Michelstadt, Germany. She was taught to draw by her Romanian governess and became obsessed with drawing with expression because it was not as confining or labeling as oral language. Living in Germany after the end of World War II greatly affected the liking she took to drawing. "We could not speak German. Germans were hated. We had to learn French and English. We were always traveling somewhere else, speaking something else. But I had a Romanian governess who taught me how to draw. I did not have to draw in German or French or English. I could just draw."

Horn spent most of her late childhood in boarding schools and at nineteen rebelled against her parents' plan of studying economics and decided to instead study art. In 1963 she attended the Hochschule für bildende Künste Hamburg (Hamburg Academy of Fine Arts). A year later she had to pull out of art school because she had contracted severe lung poisoning. "In 1964 I was 20 years old and living in Barcelona, in one of those hotels where you rent rooms by the hour. I was working with glass fibre, without a mask, because nobody said it was dangerous, and I got very sick. For a year I was in a sanatorium. My parents died. I was totally isolated."

After leaving the sanatorium Horn began using soft materials, creating sculptures informed by her illness and long convalescence.

Horn lived in Hamburg until 1971, in London for a brief time (1971–2), and since 1973 has lived in Berlin.

Work
Horn is one of a generation of German artists who came to international prominence in the 1980s. She practices body art, but works in different media, including performance art, installation art, sculpture, and film.  She also writes poetry. Sometimes her poetry is influenced by her work, and on many occasions it has inspired her work. When Horn returned to the Hamburg academy she continued to make cocoon-like things. She worked with padded body extensions and prosthetic bandages. In the late sixties she began creating performance art and continued to use bodily extensions.

Body sculptures
In 1968 Horn produced her first body sculptures, in which she attached objects and instruments to the human body, taking as her theme the contact between a person and his or her environment. Einhorn (Unicorn) is one of Horn's best known performance pieces: a long horn worn on her head, its title a pun on her name. She presented Einhorn at the 1972 Documenta. Its subject is a woman who is described by Horn as "very bourgeois", "21 years-old and ready to marry. She is spending her money on new bedroom furniture". She walks through a field and forest on a summer morning wearing only a white horn protruding directly from the front of the top of her head, held there by straps. These straps are almost identical to the ones in Frida Kahlo's  painting Broken Column. The image, with wheat floating around the woman's hips, is simultaneously mythic and modern.

Pencil Mask is another body extension piece, made up of six straps running horizontally and three straps running vertically. Where the straps intersect a pencil has been attached. When moving her face back and forth on a near a wall the pencil marks that are made correspond directly with her movements.

Finger Gloves is a performance piece and the main prop of that performance piece and was done in 1972. They are worn like gloves, but the finger form extends with balsa wood and cloth. By being able to see what she was touching and the way in which she was touching it, it felt as if her fingers were extended and in her mind the illusion was created that she was actually touching what the extensions were touching. There is another piece that she did that is very similar to this one. It is part of her Berlin Exercises series done in 1974 called "Scratching Both Walls at Once". In this piece she made more finger extension gloves, but this time measured it so that they specifically fit the selected space. If the chosen participant stood in the middle of the room, they could exactly touch opposing walls simultaneously.

Another piece that involves the illusion of feeling and one's hand is Feather Fingers. (1972). A feather is attached to each finger with a metal ring. The hand becomes "as symmetrical (and as sensitive) as a bird's wing". When touching the opposite arm with these feather fingers one can feel the touch on the left arm and of the fingers on the right hand moving as if to touch the left arm but it is instead the feathers which make contact. Rebecca Horn describes the effect: "it is as if one hand had suddenly become disconnected from the other like two utterly unrelated beings. My sense of touch becomes so disrupted that the different behavior of each hand triggers contradictory sensations."  This piece focuses greatly on sensitivity.

Sculpture
Horn continued to explore the image of feathers in her works of the 1970s and 1980s. Many of her feathered pieces wrap a figure in the manner of a cocoon, or function as masks or fans, to cover or imprison the body. Some of these pieces are Cockfeather (1971), Cockfeather Mask (1973), Cockatoo Mask (1973), and Paradise Widow (1975).

Various "machines" are the subjects of Horn's work in the 1980s. Among others, she created a machine to mimic the human act of painting in The Little Painting School Performs a Waterfall (1988). Thirteen feet above the floor on a gallery wall, three fan-shaped paint brushes mounted on flexible metal arms slowly flutter down into cups filled with blue and green acrylic paint. After a few seconds of immersion they snap backward, spattering paint onto the wall, the ceiling, the floor, and onto canvases projected from the wall below. The brushes immediately resume their descent, and the cycle is repeated until each canvas is covered in paint.

In the 1990s a series of her impressive sculptures were presented in places of historical importance. Examples are the Tower of the Nameless in Vienna (1994), Concert in Reverse in Munich (1997), Mirror of the Night in an abandoned synagogue in Cologne (1998) and Concert for Buchenwald at Weimar (1999). In Weimar, the Concert for Buchenwald was composed on the premises of a former tram depot. The artist has layered 40 metre long walls of ashes behind glass, as archives of petrifaction. At the same time, the theme of bodily vitality, which the artist had been exploring since the seventies, was developed in site-specific installations that investigated the subject of the latent energy of places and the magnetic flows of space. This cycle comprises High Moon, New York (1991); El Reio de la Luna, Barcelona (1992); Spirit di Madreperla, Naples (2002). For the 1992 Olympics in Barcelona, Horn was commissioned to create the steel sculpture L'Estel Ferit.

Many Horn works also explore ambiguities in the idea of lenses. One would think that a large tinted lens exists for protection and cover, but it also has the effect of drawing attention to the person or figure behind it. The paradox of looking out and looking back is explored in her installation piece for Taipei 101, Dialogue between Yin and Yang (2002). The work sets up interactions between viewers, environment and sculpture as it uses binoculars and mirrors to suggest the passive and active energies.

Film
In what amounted to over ten years of life in New York, Horn undertook the production of highly narrative, full-length films, and incorporated the sculptures and movements from her earlier work into this new context of film, transforming their significance. Horn made her first feature-length film in 1978, Der Eintänzer, about a young man named Max, a blind man, and twins. Later films include La Ferdinanda: Sonata for a Medici Villa, and Buster's Bedroom. La Ferdinanda is in German; the other films are in English. In all of these films Horn's obsession with the imperfect body and the balance between figure and objects is apparent. She has also collaborated with Jannis Kounellis and produced some films, including the film Buster's Bedroom (1990) which was shot by the Academy Award-winning Sven Nykvist and stars Donald Sutherland, Geraldine Chaplin, and Martin Wuttke. For Buster’s Bedroom und Roussel, she collaborated with German writer Martin Mosebach on the respective screenplays.

A number of Horn’s mechanised sculptures appear in her films, notably The Feathered Prison Fan (1978)—covered in large overlapping fans that is big enough to enclose an adult inside—in Der Eintänzer and The Peacock Machine (1979–80), another sculpture that folds and unfolds beautiful white peacock plumage in La Ferdinanda.

Other projects
Rebecca Horn is the subject of a book entitled The Glance of Infinity. In 2008 and 2009, Japanese artist Masanori Handa was mentored by Horn as part of the Rolex Mentor and Protégé Arts Initiative.

Exhibitions
When Harald Szeemann invited Rebecca Horn to participate in the 1972 Documenta in Kassel, she was a virtually unknown twenty-eight-year-old artist. Sigmar Polke had performed in her piece Simon Sigmar in 1971, and it was through him that Szeeman heard of her. Horn had her first solo exhibition at the Galerie René Block, West Berlin, in 1973. She has since participated in the Venice Biennale, Skulptur Projekte Münster, and the Biennale of Sydney, and is one of very few artists who has been selected to participate in Documenta on four separate occasions. Her solo show at the Museum of Contemporary Art, Los Angeles, "Rebecca Horn: Diving through Buster's Bedroom", featured eighteen large-scale mechanized sculptures that relate to the themes and content of the artist's feature-length film, Buster's Bedroom. In 1993 the Solomon R. Guggenheim Museum, New York, mounted a mid-career retrospective organized by Germano Celant and Nancy Spector, which traveled to the Stedelijk Van Abbemuseum, Eindhoven; Neue Nationalgalerie, Berlin; Kunsthalle Wien, Vienna; Tate Gallery and Serpentine Gallery, London; and Musée de Grenoble. In 2005 the Hayward Gallery in London held a comprehensive Rebecca Horn retrospective; in conjunction with this exhibition, St Paul's Cathedral showed Horn's installation Moon Mirror.

Public collections
Horn's work is included in major public collections worldwide, including:
 Harvard Art Museums, Cambridge
 Solomon R. Guggenheim Museum, New York
 The Museum of Modern Art, New York
 Museum of Contemporary Art, Los Angeles
 San Francisco Museum of Modern Art, San Francisco
 Art Gallery of New South Wales, Australia
 Castello di Rivoli Museum of Contemporary Art, Turin, Italy
 Tate Gallery, London
 Centre Georges Pompidou, Paris
 Centre for International Light Art (CILA), Unna, Germany
 Zentrum für Kunst und Medientechnologie, Karlsruhe, Germany
 Stedelijk Museum, Amsterdam
 Van Abbemuseum, Eindhoven
 Walker Art Center

Recognition
At the Carnegie International in 1988, Horn won the Carnegie Prize for an installation work titled The Hyra Forest/Performing: Oscar Wilde. In 1992 Horn became the first woman to receive the prestigious Goslarer Kaiserring, and was awarded the Medienkunstpreis Karlsruhe for achievements in technology and art. She was later awarded the 2010 Praemium Imperiale in Sculpture and the Grande Médaille des Arts Plastiques 2011 from the Académie d’Architecture de Paris. In 2012, Horn received the Austrian Decoration for Science and Art.

See also
 List of German women artists

References

External links
 
 
 Rebecca Horn on Artcyclopedia
 Review of Horn's latest show by C.B.Liddell
 Interview 23 May 2005, The Guardian
 Two Horn works at the Guggenheim
 Biography of Horn at Tate Modern  Various works can also be viewed.
 Rebecca Horn: "Berlin-Übungen in neun Stücken", 1974/75 (video)

1944 births
Living people
People from Michelstadt
German installation artists
Feminist artists
Film directors from Hesse
German experimental filmmakers
German women film directors
Knights Commander of the Order of Merit of the Federal Republic of Germany
Recipients of the Praemium Imperiale
Recipients of the Austrian Decoration for Science and Art
Recipients of the Pour le Mérite (civil class)
Members of the Academy of Arts, Berlin
20th-century German women artists
Honorary Members of the Royal Academy
Women experimental filmmakers
University of Fine Arts of Hamburg alumni